Boulder Weekly is an alternative newsweekly that publishes every Thursday in Boulder, Colorado. The paper is a member of the Association of Alternative Newsweeklies (AAN) and is owned and published by Stewart Sallo.

Overview
Following the Loma Prieta earthquake in 1989, Sallo decided it was time to leave Santa Cruz, Calif., where he owned and published two other publications — Summer Santa Cruz and Student Guide. By 1992, he had set his sights on Boulder, Colo. He moved to Boulder in 1993, and the first edition of Boulder Weekly hit the stands on Aug. 19 of that year. In the years since, Boulder Weekly has garnered numerous state journalism awards for opinion, news, features, and entertainment writing.

For several years, from 1996 to 2000, the Weekly had a competitor in the Boulder Planet; Sallo considers the Weekly's perseverance over the well-funded competitor a source of pride and professional accomplishment. The paper is currently the only independent newspaper published in Boulder.

Sallo originally envisioned the paper as business opportunity in a town that didn't have a weekly newspaper. However, a story written by Joel Dyer in September 1994 changed Sallo's perspective about the potential for a newspaper to create change in the world ("Deadly ground: Beech Aircraft toxins poison open space," Sept. 14, 1994). As a result, Boulder Weekly'''s editorial direction shifted toward a more aggressive, alternative approach to news. Dyer later became editor of Boulder Weekly, eventually leaving the paper to write books and publish his own newsweekly, the Fort Collins Weekly, from 2002 to 2007.

Greg Campbell continued with that same editorial direction, putting the paper in the spotlight with articles such as, "Eternal flame: Think you've paid at the pump? Try paying with your life. Boulder Weekly visits Nigeria," April 19, 2001, which exposed the suffering of a Nigerian village at the hands of an Italian gas company. Campbell is the author of Blood Diamonds: Tracing the Deadly Path of the World's Most Precious Stones.Wayne Laugesen became editor of Boulder Weekly after working at Soldier of Fortune'' magazine and brought a conservative balance to the paper. He is best known for his award-winning opinion column "Wayne's Word," and his byline has appeared in national magazines and nearly every major newspaper in the United States.

Pamela White became the first woman editor of the paper in February 2003. An award-winning journalist and novelist, White professionalized the newsroom operation and brought with her a special emphasis on human-rights reporting, with a focus on prison issues, women's rights and American Indian issues. She came to the Weekly after serving as editor of Colorado Daily, where she and her staff won the 2000 Roy W. Howard Award for Public Service (National Journalism Awards) and several other national awards for investigative journalism.

Joel Dyer returned to the Weekly as editor in November 2011.

The paper currently employees 18 full-time staff, in addition to numerous freelance writers and circulation drivers. It publishes opinion, news, an outdoor recreation section, a food section, and an arts and entertainment section, as well as several special editions, notably The Best of Boulder County, tri-annual Boulderganic, Summer Scene, Student Guide, and VOTE, its annual election guide. Regular contributors to the paper include populist author and columnist Jim Hightower, astrologer Rob Brezsny author Ben Corbett, former Boulder mayor Paul Danish, and music critic David Kirby.

Awards
Among the Boulder Weekly's awards, in April 2018, it won 27 awards in the 2017 Society of Professional Journalists' Top of the Rockies competition, including 10 first prizes.

References

External links
 Boulder Weekly

Newspapers published in Colorado
Weekly newspapers published in the United States
Mass media in Boulder, Colorado